Romance with a Double Bass is a 1974 British short comedy film directed by Robert Young. It was adapted by Young, John Cleese and Connie Booth (uncredited) from a screenplay by Bill Owen that was originally based on the short story of the same name by Anton Chekhov. It stars Cleese and his then wife Connie Booth in the leading roles.

Plot
Smychkov (Cleese), a bassist, shows up too early for the ball of a beautiful princess, and decides to spend his extra time skinny dipping in the nearby lake. The princess (Booth), meanwhile, has gone fishing at the lake, and later decides to go skinny dipping as well. However, things change when a thief absconds with both Smychkov's and the Princess's clothes, and while the Princess is wandering around stark naked, she meets Smychkov.  After their initially embarrassing encounter, he tries to help her return to the castle by hiding her in his bass case.

Cast

Production
The movie marked John Cleese's first collaboration with the director Robert Young (they would later work on Splitting Heirs and Fierce Creatures). The cast also included Andrew Sachs who would work with Cleese and Booth in Fawlty Towers the following year.

Romance with a Double Bass was finished during October 1974 and took ten days to shoot. Filming took place at Wiltshire, England, with scenes shot in the Double Cube Room of the Wilton House and the Somerley estate.

Release
The movie was shown in theatres in 1975 along with The Eiger Sanction by Clint Eastwood.

It was released on video in 1995.

Critical response
Time Out described the movie as a "very funny, innocent and tastefully filmed nudist romp".

David Sterritt wrote that while "the plot is slender, it makes very funny jokes at the expense of class and gender hierarchies".

David Cornelius of DVD Talk praised the movie as a "wonderful, sweet, and often riotous celebration of life" that combines "playful physical comedy and whimsical nature of the love story that unfolds with a smile".

Paul Shrimpton of The Spinning Image also called it "surprisingly innocent and naive" despite Cleese and Booth spend most of the time naked; he also praised their performances "scattered with typical Cleese lunacy here and there".

References

External links
 
 Romance with a Double Bass at British Film Institute

1974 films
Films directed by Robert Young
Films with screenplays by John Cleese
1974 short films
British comedy short films
1974 comedy films
1970s English-language films
1970s British films